Hanson Field is a 16,368-seat multi-purpose stadium in Macomb, Illinois, USA. The stadium which opened in 1950 is home to the Western Illinois Leathernecks football team and track and field team. The field is named after former WIU football coach/A.D. and Marine legend Rock Hanson. A unique feature of the facility is an extensive hillside that surrounds the field allowing for additional seating for thousands of spectators. Outside the stadium, a statue of former WIU track and field coach and two time Olympic gold medalist Lee Calhoun stands and a bulldog statue is located at the main entrance.

History
A record crowd of 19,850 watched the Leathernecks defeat Central Michigan, Oct. 20, 1973.

From 1996 through 2004, Hanson Field was the training camp home of the National Football League's St. Louis Rams.

Renovations
In 2001, the main entrance of the stadium was renovated by adding an iron gate, brick pillars and an arch displaying the words, Hanson Field. The stadium's east side received a $5 million face lift prior to the 2007 season. The renovation to the student seating section, funded largely by a facilities enhancement and life safety fee at the request of student leaders, included new bleachers, increased seating capacity, a new entrance, restrooms and concession stands.

In 2011, Matrix Turf was installed on the field.

See also
 List of NCAA Division I FCS football stadiums

References

External links
 

American football venues in Illinois
Athletics (track and field) venues in Illinois
College football venues
College track and field venues in the United States
Multi-purpose stadiums in the United States
Western Illinois Leathernecks football
Western Illinois Leathernecks sports venues
Sports venues completed in 1950
1950 establishments in Illinois